The 8th Rhythmic Gymnastics Asian Championships was held in Tashkent, Uzbekistan from 8 - 10 May 2016.

Medal winners

Medal table

Results

Details

References

External links

 Rhythmic Gymnastics Results

Rhythmic Gymnastics Asian Championships
2016 in Uzbekistani sport
Gymnastics competitions in Uzbekistan
International gymnastics competitions hosted by Uzbekistan
2016 in gymnastics  
Sport in Tashkent